Maldivians (ދިވެހިން, dhivehin) are an Indo-Aryan ethnic group and nation native to the historic region of the Maldive Islands comprising what is now the Republic of Maldives and the island of Minicoy in Union Territory of Lakshadweep, India. All Maldivians share the same culture and speak the Maldivian language, which is a member of the southern group of Indo-Aryan languages. For ethnographic and linguistic purposes as well as geopolitical reasons, anthropologists divide the Maldivian people into three subgroups.

Subgroups
 The main group of Maldivians, numbering more than 250,000. This group inhabits the numerous atolls stretching from Ihavandhippolhu (Haa Alif) to Haddhunmathi (Laamu) in Maldives. They constitute over 70% of the total population of all Maldivians. On a larger scale, the third group also comes under this group. From this group comes the standard dialect of the Maldivian language which is spoken in the Maldive's capital, Male', along with the central atolls. Slightly differing variants which are very closely related to the former are spoken in the rest of the islands, from the far north of Maldives down to Laamu Atoll.
 The southern group of Maldivians, living in the three southernmost atolls of the equatorial zone (Huvadhu, Fuvahmulah and Addu atolls) in Maldives. This group numbers approximately 60,000 and constitutes about 20% of the total population of all Maldivians. The earliest known settlements have been found in this region. According to researchers, this group of Maldivians has the closest proximity to the original Maldivian people in terms of linguistics as well as ethnicity. Each of the 3 atolls of this region speak their own distinctive forms of the Maldivian language (Huvadhu bas, Mulaku bas, Addu bas), which are significantly different from the rest and as researchers suggest having a closer affinity to what may have been the original.
 The people of Minicoy (Malikun) – Mahls, numbering about 10,000. The island of Minicoy lies at the northern end of the atoll chain inhabited by Maldivians and is the northernmost group of the Maldivian people. They are only about 3% of the total amount of Maldivians. Although the people of Minicoy are identical to the main group of Maldivians from the first group in terms of ethnicity and linguistics and on a larger scale comes under that group, the day-to-day politics of Minicoy and after the secession of the island from Maldivian rule and affiliating with the Indian government, thus acquiring non-Maldivian citizenship has made this group be labeled as one among the subgroups of Maldivians. Due to reasons such as politics, and having to live in great isolation from the remaining Maldivian people, the Minicoians are steadily undergoing a process of acculturation. This group has its own dialect (called Maliku bas or Mahl) which retains some features of an older Maldivian, and shows Malayalam influences as well. Still, the dialect is mutually intelligible with the standard Maldivian dialect and is more related to the slighter variants of northern Maldives from the first group.

Myths and legends
There is no historical evidence about the origin of Maldivians; there is also no indication that there was any negrito or other aboriginal population, such as the Andamanese. No archaeology has been conducted to investigate the prehistory of the islands. There is, however, a Tamil–Malayalam substratum, in addition to other later cultural influences in the islands.
Bengali, Odia, and Sinhalese people have had trading connections with Dhivehi people in the past.

Conjectures have been made by scholars who argue that the ancestors of Maldivian people arrived in the Maldives from North West and West India, from Kalibangan between 2500 and 1700 BC and that they formed a distinct ethnic group around the 6th century BC.

Myths of origin
According to Maldivian folklore the main myths of origin are reflecting the dependence of the Maldivians on the coconut tree and the tuna fish.
A legend says that the first inhabitants of the Maldives died in great numbers, but a great sorcerer or fandita man-made coconut trees grow out of the skulls of the buried corpses of the first settlers. Therefore, the coconut tree is said to have an anthropomorphic origin according to Maldive lore for this reason. The word naashi (coconut shell) is also the word used for the skull in the Dhivehi language.
The coconut tree occupies a central place in the present-day Maldive national emblem.

The tuna fish is said to have been brought to the Maldivian waters by a mythical seafarer (maalimi) called Bodu Niyami Kalēfanu who went close to the Dagas (the mythical tree at the end of the world) to bring this valuable fish.

Legend of the first settlers
One of the earliest people who settled in the Maldives were from the Malabar Coast of India and northwestern shores of Sri Lanka, and are of Tamils and Malayalis ancestry, which is clear through strong Tamil–Malayalam substratum in language and culture.  The Giraavaru people are considered as one of the earliest settlers. They were technologically advanced people, building sailing boats called dhonis.

These people used words such as varam for the islands in which they lived. Examples given in the old manuscript are: Noḷivaram, Kuruhinnavaram, and Girāvaram.  Many of the old terms used by Maldivian fishermen come from the Dravidian languages, leading one to the assumption that these terms were brought by people from southern coastal India in ancient times. Historical records show that in the southern and central atolls of the Maldives, occupations such as farming and weaving were important in the early days.

A short time after the arrival of the Indo-Aryans and the introduction of the Hindu religion, a prince of India is said to have arrived in the Maldives. This is the period calculated earlier from oral tradition, and the story also corresponds to that from the Mahavamsa chronicle of Sri Lanka, about the king's son who was exiled from his country and arrived in Lanka, one of his ships losing its way and arriving in the Maldives.   In the Maldivian legend, the prince who arrived in the Maldives, was the son of Brahmaditiya, king of Kalinga (Brahmadatta, King of Kalinga at the time of Buddha's death c. 500 – 350 BC), a kingdom on the south-east of India (modern Orissa). King Brahmaditiya was displeased with his son and sent him to Dheeva Maari (Maldives). The name of this prince was Sri Soorudasaruna.
Sri Soorudasaruna established a kingdom of the Adeetha Vansha Dynasty (Solar Dynasty) in Dhiva Maari, a short period before the reign of Emperor Ashoka in India. This would place the establishment of the first kingdom in the Maldives circa the 4th century BC. The tradition then states that Emperor Ashoka established his kingdom in Pataliputra in India and that his people went preaching the religion and teachings of Buddha to a place called Bairat, to the west of Pataliputra. A group of people came to the Maldives from Bairat in order to teach the religion of Buddha. These people are said to have arrived on these islands during Ashoka's reign, probably when he sent Buddhist missionaries to all the neighbouring countries, in the 3rd century BC. At the time the Buddhist missionaries arrived in the Maldives, the country was called Dheeva Mahl. 
Around the 2nd century AD, there was an influx of Arab traders who travelled and stopped by the Maldives en route to the Far East – their first record of the Maldives islands, which they called Mahal Dibiyat, is from the Arab travellers. The Maldives provided enormous quantities of cowry shells, an international currency of the early ages. The cowry is now the symbol of the Maldives Monetary Authority. Mahal Dibiyat is the name given to the islands by medieval Arab travellers. 
Abu al-Barakat Yusuf al-Barbari, a North African Arab, is credited with converting the Maldivians to Islam in 1153.

Legend of the first ruling dynasty
The myth of the origin of the ruling dynasty is the story of a prince named Koimala. In the Muslim traditions recorded in the Lōamāafāanu and Rādavaḷi chronicles all the pre-Muslim royalty are represented by a king, whose successor was converted to Islam. The name Koimala Kalo is also suggestive: koi or koyi in Maldivian language means son, lad or prince (derived from Malayalam koya, son, prince, master, cf. the Dravidian root kō, king). The component malā may or may not be derived from māla as in Māla-dīv, but, if so, the name would mean 'prince of the Maldives'. The term kalō is a common word of man, used as a term of endearment. The title of former Maldivian kings was kattiri bovana mahaa radun, 'Kattiri' (ކައްތިރި) meaning Kshatriya in Maldivian language.

One oral tradition says that the Giraavaru people are the indigenous people of the Maldives who were in the islands before Koimala arrived. They are of Tamil origin, and the earliest island community of the Maldives; their presence predates Buddhism and the arrival of Indo-Aryans in the archipelago. This may be the reason that the Dhivehi kinship system is part of the Dravidian origin, and bears evidence of some matriliny, like the Nayar and other matrilineal groups of Kerala. Some of the kinship terms are clearly derived from Malayalam.

Five versions of the myth are given here and their significance in terms of cultural history is explained.

 1. The following version was recorded by Bell in 1922:
Once upon a time, when the Maldives were still sparsely inhabited, a prince of royal birth named Koimala, who had married the daughter of the king of Ceylon, made a voyage with her in two vessels from Srendib [Sri Lanka] Island. Reaching the Maldives they were becalmed and rested a while at Rasgetheemu island in North Maalhosmadulu Atoll.

The Maldive Islanders, learning that the two chief visitors were of Ceylon Royal descent invited them to remain; and ultimately proclaimed Koimala their king at Rasgetheemu, the original 'King's Island'.

Subsequently, Koimala and his spouse migrated thence to Male' and settled there with the consent of the aborigines of Giraavaru Island, then the most important community of Male' Atoll.

The two ships were dispatched to Lanka, and brought over other people of 'the Lion Race' (Sinhalese).

To Koimala and his queen was born a male child who was called Kalaminja. He reigned as a Buddhist for twelve years and was then converted to Islam, ruling for thirteen years more before finally departing for Mecca.

This ruler's daughter married the chief minister and reigned as a nominal Sultana. She gave birth to a son also called Kalaminja, who, in turn, married a lady of the country.

From them, the subsequent rulers of the Maldives were descended.

 2. According to this version, which Maloney heard in Male', Koimala's parents came from India, not Sri Lanka: The Indian king was angry with his son, and sent him off with his wife in two boats; they had 700 soldiers. They came to Rasgetheemu in Raa Atoll, and when he became king there, people called that island Rasgetheemu "King's Landing". Then the king and queen came to Male', and Koimala was born to that Indian couple.
 3. The following variant Maloney heard in Noon Atoll: "... When Koimala and his wife came, there were already people here. Because she was a princess of royal lineage, people asked her husband to rule. Koimala sent ships to Sri Lanka and brought back more people. It is said that a beautiful woman named Malakamana from the Maldives was one of the early people who settled Sri Lanka."
 4. A myth Maloney heard in Manadhoo, Noon Atoll, is, in condensed form, as follows:
One day, while a hunter king of Sri Lanka was hunting, he caught a man beast in his net. The man-beast couldn't walk, so the king taught him to do it. The man-beast then married the king's daughter, but he made political trouble in Sri Lanka, so was forced to leave. He and the princess arrived in Rasgetheemu and they lived there for some time, where the locals there asked them to rule them.

 5. Another version Maloney heard in Hulhumeedhoo, Addu Atoll, in the far south of the country, is as follows:
There was a king of India who was a hunter. Once, while out hunting with a net, he saw a creature which is like a human but walked on all fours, and which disturbed the people. This creature would also take hunters' nets and steal their prey, so the king couldn't get any catch. The king considered how he might capture this creature. He made big weights for his net, which no ordinary human could lift, and which would prevent the creature from taking the hunting net. One day, the king, with the help of many men, put the net over the creature, which could not get out because of the large stone weights. The king took the creature to the palace and looked after him well, and because he knew no language, the king taught him language, which took a long time. The creature started helping the king by showing him treasures in the forest, and the king came to respect him.

The king had a daughter who fell in love with this creature (in an alternate version, the king forced his daughter to marry the creature). The king, being angry, put the couple on a ship and sent them off into exile. Their ship came to Laam (Hadummati) Atoll (towards the south), where the exiled pair saw a crow that cried. They thought the crow was not a good omen, and it was, therefore, undesirable to land there, so they went on to Male'. They settled in what is now Sultan Park (the site of the former palace) and started a kingdom.

After fifteen years, a jinni began to come from the ocean every once a month and disturbed the people... (from here follows the story of the saint who came and dispelled the jinni and caused all the people to become converted to Islam from Buddhism and Hinduism).

Gujaratis
Maloney says Gujarat, with its indented coastline and its proximity to the old navigation routes of the Mesopotamian and Indus civilisations, has apparently maintained a tradition of navigation over the past 4000 years. Certainly, the earliest Buddhist literature indicates active seafaring from its ports. It was from Gujarat that North Indian civilisation impinged upon the Maldives and Sri Lanka. From Gujarat, North Indian civilisation also expanded to Java and other parts of Southeast Asia. The export of this civilisation to all coasts of South Asia and Southeast Asia began about 500 B.C., but during the Mauryan period and the diffusion of Buddhism, sea traffic in the Bay of Bengal supplemented and, to some extent, surpassed that originating along the coasts of Western India.

Three Jataka tales cited above seem to refer to the Maldives, particularly the comment that exiles from Bharukaccha went to a thousand islands [Laccadive and Maldive islands] where they found the standing room, and that these were near an island named for coconuts [Kerala]. This suggests that not only did seafarers emanating from Bharukaccha and Suppara visit the Maldives, but Gujaratis actually settled there in pre-Buddhist times. The other Jataka tales suggest that ships from Gujarat going to Southeast Asia stopped in the Maldives and that merchants in search of treasures sailed in several seas called – maala (or maara).

The Maldives might well have been settled parallel with the arrival of Indo-Aryan speakers in Sri Lanka, as suggested in the above interpretations of the Sri Lanka myths and the Koimala story.

Mariners from the north-western coasts of the peninsula, from the time they commenced sailing to southern India, must have on occasion been blown over to the Maldives—unmanned canoes and rafts from Kerala even now get wafted there from time to time – and the dangers of shipwreck vividly described in several of the Jātakas might have arisen from contact with some of the thousands of reefs in the Maldives, which sailors have long dreaded. It may be, therefore, that shipwrecked Gujaratis, as well as exiles, were early settlers on the islands of the Laccadive-Maldives archipelago.

Geographic distribution

Maldives
All Maldivians are native to the historic region of the Maldive Islands comprising what is now the Republic of Maldives and the island of Minicoy in Union territory of Lakshadweep, India. The secession of Minicoy from Maldivian rule and affiliating with the Indian government gradually led to the emergence of a Maldivian population of Indian citizens who came to be known as Mahls.

Being the heartland of Maldivian people, more than 97% of all Maldivians are from the Maldives. For all the Maldivian communities across the world (including the people of Minicoy) their origin lies in the Maldives. The Maldivian community of the Maldives consists of two major groups from the three subgroups of Maldivians: The main group of Maldivians, the southern group of Maldivians (also known as Suvadivians), and the Mahls (ethnic Maldivians from the Indian island of Minicoy).

Southern group of Maldivians
As a result of some political activities which occurred in the South during the early 1960s, the term Suvadivian has been adopted by some authors to refer to the southern group of Maldivians. From 1959 to 1963 there was a short-lived breakaway government named United Suvadive Republic which was formed by the Southerners, from which the name originated though there are no such native names. The names Suvadive and Suvadivian suggest that the origin of the names lye in the ancient name for the three southernmost atolls of Huvadhu, Fuvahmulah and Addu which was Suvadiva.

The Suvadivians, living in the three southernmost atolls of the equatorial zone (Huvadhu, Fuvahmulah and Addu atolls) number approximately 60,000 and constitute about 20% of the total population of Maldivians. According to researchers, this group of Maldivians has the closest proximity to the original Maldivian people in terms of linguistics as well as on ethnic grounds. The reason behind this suggested by researchers and proven from historical records is that there was less interference from the outside world to this group. Unlike the other group of Maldivians, this group was not affected by the Portuguese rule in the Maldives as it does not exceed the Suvadiva channel. Also, there was no interference from traders and travellers as much as in the case of the other.

Each of the 3 atolls of the Suvadiva region speaks its own distinctive forms of the Maldivian language (Huvadhu bas, Mulaku bas and Addu bas), which are much different from the rest and as suggested by researchers, having a closer affinity to what may have been the original. Thus, the native features of the original Maldivian people are preserved in this group greater than any other group of Maldivians.

Main group of Maldivians

Unlike the southern minority, this group of Maldivians were subject to foreign intercourse. There were numerous occasions of reported interference from outsiders such as traders, travellers, etc... Also, the Portuguese rule and many other factors pushed this group into a state where imported materials got mixed into their linguistics as well as their ethnic background to a large extent.

India

The secession of Minicoy from Maldivian rule and affiliating with the Indian government gradually led to the emergence of a Maldivian population holding Indian citizenship. This group of Maldivians consists of the people of Minicoy and migrant communities from Minicoy across India and elsewhere. Except for the people from Minicoy, there is no community of ethnic Maldivians with Indian citizenship. This group of Maldivians are officially referred as Mahls. The people locally identify themselves as Malikun. The Mahls make up the third subgroup of Maldivians.

People of Minicoy (Malikun) – Mahls

Mahls are the third subgroup of Maldivians centred on the island of Minicoy making up the only community of ethnic Maldivians in India. This group has its own dialect (called Maliku bas or Mahl) which retains some features of archaic Maldivian language, and shows Malayalam influences as well. Still, the dialect is mutually intelligible with the standard dialect of Maldivian and is more related to the slighter variants of northern Maldives.

In the case of linguistics and ethnic grounds, this group of Maldivians is identical to the main group of Maldivians in the Maldives. However, the secession of Minicoy from Maldivian rule and gradually becoming part of India, thus becoming the only group of ethnic Maldivians with non-Maldivian citizenship made anthropologists label the Mahls among the subgroups. The isolation of this group from the rest of the Maldivians and the acculturation process which the Mahls are undergoing as a result of this as well as the change in nationality is one of the reasons for the separation of this group from the main group of Maldivians. The origin of this group like any other group of Maldivians lies in the Maldives. The story of the Tivarun, the linguistics of the people in Minicoy, and many other factors prove this side of the story.

Mahls are the only community of ethnic Maldivians (excluding migrant communities) outside the Republic of Maldives. They make up about 3% of the total population of all Maldivians.

Most Mahls live in their native land of Maliku (Minicoy). Mahls are 15.67% of the total population of Lakshadweep emerging as a separate ethnic group from the rest of the population. All Mahl communities in India emerged from Minicoy.

There are Mahl communities (migrant communities from Minicoy) in other parts of India too. A number of Mahls have settled in the districts of Kozhikode, Malappuram, Ernakulam and Thiruvananthapuram (Trivandrum) in the southern state of Kerala. The ancestors of present Mahl communities in Kerala migrated from Minicoy and settled there in the 17th century when the islands of Lakshadweep came under the rule of Ali Rajahs/Arakkal Bheevi of Kannur.

Since 1957, this group of Maldivians in Minicoy are totally off-limits for their Maldivian counterparts in the Maldives. Direct transport between Minicoy and the Maldives was forbidden by the Indian government. Thus, this Indian group of Maldivians is steadily undergoing a process of acculturation owing to a lack of contact with the remaining Maldivian people and pressure to use other languages such as Malayalam, English, and Hindi. This proves to have a big influence on the culture, linguistics, and other day-to-day affairs of this group of Maldivians.

Emigrant communities
A significant number of Maldivian emigrant communities can be found in several countries. The emigrant communities could only be located from the Maldivian side as it is only the Maldivians who are all of the same ethnicity, unlike India where the presence of thousands of cultures and ethnicities make the records more stringent on this matter. Since ethnic Maldivians of Minicoy are only no more than 0.0015% of the total population of India compared to 100% of their counterparts in the Maldives, it is only from the Maldivian embassies across the world that this information could be gathered.

Sri Lanka

There are approximately 20,000 people of Maldivian ethnicity living in Sri Lanka, as of 2013.

Genetics and Research Studies

In 1899, Professor John Stanley Gardiner visited the Maldives, during which time; he collected anthropometrical data of a number of Maldivians from many islands. Analysis of this data by Dr. Wynfrid Duckworth, suggested that there were three major sources of immigration into the country. These are:
 The peninsula of Hindustan with Ceylon,
 The coast of Arabia and possibly of Africa,
 The western shores of the Malay Peninsula, and the islands of the Malaya Archipelago.
(Duckworth 1912: 8–30).

In 1997, a Maldivian NGO, the Society for Health Education, conducted a study on the mutations of thalassaemia found in the Maldives. This study showed one mutation that probably originated in the Middle East, another mutation which could have been derived from Portuguese or Algerians, and another which probably originated from South Asia and Malays. The observations are consistent with the historical records of Maldives, showing that early travellers from India, Indonesia, North Africa, the Red Sea and the Persian Gulf areas, settled in the Maldives. (Firdous et al. 1998:148,149). Thalassaemia is the commonest genetically transmitted blood disease found in the Maldives, and the results of this study suggest that many of the people now living in the Maldives had ancestors who came from the above-mentioned countries.

Anthropological studies, as well as ethnographic and linguistic researches, suggest that in terms of ancestry Maldivians share similar genes principally with the Sinhalese of Sri Lanka as well as western Indian populations, such as Marathis, Konkanis and Gujaratis with traces of Arab, Malay, southern Indian and North African genes in the population.

In 2013, a genetic study of the Maldivian population by the department of Human Genetics, Liden University, which was published online in the American Journal of Physical Anthropology revealed very interesting facts about the genetic origin of Maldivian people.
The research studied autosomal DNA-, mitochondrial DNA-, and Y-chromosomal DNA markers in a representative sample of 141 unrelated Maldivians, with 119 from six major settlements. The researchers found a total of 63 different mtDNA haplotypes that could be allocated to 29 mtDNAs, mostly within the M, R and U clades. They also found 66 different Y-STR haplotypes in 10 Y chromosome haplogroups, predominantly R1a1, R2, H, L and J2. The study concluded that their new genetic data agree with the commonly reported Maldivian ancestry in South Asia, but furthermore suggest multiple, independent immigration events and asymmetrical migration of females and males across the archipelago.

The genetic study confirmed that the most likely origin of the Maldivian population is in South Asia with possible gene flow from the Middle East. Also, it has been pointed out that the Dhivehi language of the Maldives is the southernmost Indo-Aryan language and sharing of specific haplogroups with Indo-Aryan populations mostly from India and from Sri Lanka, could point to a common origin of these populations.

Culture

Language and literature
Maldivians have strong feelings towards the Maldivian language. It has historically been, and to large extent still is, central to the Maldivian identity. Unlike the other languages of South India, it is an Indo-European language, while other South Indian languages are Dravidian languages. However the language shows some influences of neighbouring Dravidian languages on it, and has a number of loanwords from Dravidian vocabulary.

Religion
The Maldivians are entirely Muslims, adhering to the Sunni school of thought. In the Maldives which is the heartland of Maldivians and home for more than 97% of the Maldivian people, the national religion is Islam. Islam is the country's state religion as well as the backbone of the society with daily life in the country being regulated according to the tenets of Islam and government regulations too being based on the regulations of Islamic law (Shari'a). The law of the country prohibits the practice of any other religion by the country's citizens. In general all Maldivians from the island of Minicoy too are Sunni Muslims.

Visual art and architecture

Most traditional Maldivian art is influenced by Perso-Arabic tradition in some form and usually centres on Islam since all the Maldivians are Muslims. The skill of visual art and architecture among the Maldivians is centered in the Maldives since the people of Minicoy are mainly sailors.

Various fine art practices exist in the Maldives at present. Primary among them is drawing and painting. Sculpture and crafts that overlap with art-making also exist in the country. However, due to various limitations, they have not flourished as art forms. Painting and drawing also exist in similar circumstances. Lack of avenues in which to exhibit, and lack of arts education and training, combined with a growing understanding that these arts are best served in the tourist souvenir trade, has hampered the healthy development of these arts.
However, with the establishment of private galleries and with various exhibitions organized by the government and the artists themselves, in the last 15 years, the awareness that painting can be an expressive art form apart from also being a lucrative commercial activity has provided encouragement for several young Maldivians to pursue painting, and to an extent sculpture and other public and commercial art forms. Renewed interest in these arts has also led various individuals to pursue on their own whatever education they can obtain, whether through distance learning courses from foreign universities or via books and magazines. In addition, privately funded students have also been obtaining arts education and training at undergraduate and graduate levels in international universities.
More indirectly, artists also get the opportunity to meet foreign artists through the tourism trade when foreign artists visit the country as tourists. This provides the much-needed contact with artists that is so necessary to the development of any art form.
Until recently, fine arts in the Maldives have been usually defined as the various crafts and skills of craft making. These include the use of locally found materials to produce decorative and functional objects such as mats, handheld or displayed objects, etc. The present situation of the arts has come about because of a lack of critical and theoretical interpretation and a lack of dialogue and discourse in an organized, sustained, or documented form.

Performing arts
The traditional Maldivian performing arts have Indian and even African roots.

Martial arts
Martial arts among Maldivians are known as hevikamuge kulhivaruthak, while gulhamathi hifun is traditional wrestling among Maldivians.

Festivals
Most of the Maldivian festivals are related to Islam, however, there are some festivals that belong to old Maldivian traditions, like the kite flying festival. Naming a newborn child, Mauloodhu (a prayer accompanied by a festive meal), the Eid festival, and circumcision of the male child are a few events that take place where the taste of a rich cultural 'cocktails' can be experienced.

A traditional meal called Keyn is prepared for the above Mauloodhus consisting of a number of courses. A single Keyn would serve 10 – 12 people and includes rice, curries, salads, grilled fish, coconut cream, coconut syrup, bananas, puddings, and other delights.

Keyn is set out in a very large wooden dish called a Malaafaiy. The outside of this dish is placed within the dish and small individual plates are filled with curries, salads, and other items and set around the rice. This would be covered with the lid and wrapped in a white cloth and tied at the top. At meal times this would be carried into the Mauloodh Haruge (dining hall specially made for this event) and placed on straw mats for service. Individual plates and other food items in individual dishes are placed as well. Beverages are individually set in glasses. Water is served in a ceramic jug. Food is consumed using the fingers of the right hand. At the end of the meal, the hand is washed using a copper jug into a copper basin. 10 December is marked as Kandu Rōdi duvas and 14 April as Gamu Rōdi duvas on which date Maldivian language day is marked from 2011 onwards.

Dress
Traditionally Maldivian men wear a Mundu with a shirt, it is very similar to that of Malayali people. Maldivian women wear a red top called a Libaas and a long black skirt.

Cuisine

Rice, the major staple food in most Maldivian households, is usually cooked and served with Garudiya (Tuna Fish soup). Here are some of the specialty cuisines.

Bocholhi

Made of rice flour, coconut – semi-firm (grated), and coconut palm syrup by mixing all the ingredients until freed from the lump and cooked over moderate heat until the mixture is thickened.

Godhan Furhu Boa Folhi

Made of flour, coconut – semi-hard (blended to a smooth paste), eggs, coconut cream, jasmine water, coconut palm syrup, cinnamon powder, cardamom powder, and oil by mixing all the ingredients apart from the oil together. Cooked over moderate heat and once the top of the pancake dries up, turned over and cooked.

Han’dulu Aurus

Made of rice (soaked overnight), washed and blended to a smooth paste), coconut palm syrup, Jasmine water, and jasmine flowers by placing all the ingredients apart from the flowers in a thick-bottomed pan and cook over moderate heat by stirring constantly to avoid the mixture getting stuck to the bottom. Wrapped entirely with banana leaf and placed jasmine flowers over the sweets. This sweet will keep for two to three months without spoiling.

'
Han’dulu Furhu Kubus

Made of Patna Rice (soaked overnight, washed, and blended to a smooth paste), coconut – semi-firm (grated), coconut palm syrup, caster sugar, banana leaf cooking over moderate heat the grated coconut, palm sugar, and caster sugar until the mixture has thickened. Removed from heat and allowed cooling and added in the blended rice and kneaded thoroughly and combined all the ingredients well. Divided the mixture into eight portions and placed each portion on a banana leaf and wrapped it entirely to seal and wrapped a second banana leaf around it and secured well.

Dug a suitable hole in the ground in which all the wrapped dough pieces could be placed neatly. Placed coconut fibres and coconut shells and burned them in the dug hole and removed the charcoals.

Placed banana leaves within the hole and placed the wrapped dough in the heated hole and placed neatly one against another.

Covered the dough parcels placed in the hole with another large piece of banana leaf and covered the leaf with two-inch white sand. Placed the charcoals and coconut fibres and coconut shells over it and burned the coconut fibres and shells for half an hour.

Left the cooked kubus parcels overnight in the hole. In the morning scraped off the burnt ashes and charcoals aside and the sand covering the banana leaf and slowly lifted the wrapped kubus parcels.

Hukkaru

Made of coconut palm syrup by boiling the syrup over moderate heat and cook by stirring continuously until it starts to thicken. Removed from heat and whisked until frothy and cooled.

Huni Folhi

Made of Patna Rice flour, coconut – semi-hard (grated), and coconut palm syrup by cooking all the ingredients over moderate heat in a thick-bottomed pan stirring continuously.

When the mixture starts to come loose from the side of the pan removed it from the heat and take a tablespoonful of the cooked mixture, spread it on a corkwood leaf. Smoked and dried the leaves spread with the sweet over the fireplace.

Karukuri Banbukeyo

Made of a fried breadfruit (crushed coarsely), coconut palm syrup, and jasmine water by bringing the syrup and the jasmine water to boil and cooked it over moderate heat until it comes to the ribbon stage. Added the crushed breadfruit into the sugar and coated well. Removed from heat, allowed cooling, and kept in an airtight container.

Karukuri Ala

Made of fried taro (crushed coarsely), coconut palm syrup, and jasmine water by boiling the syrup and the jasmine water and cooking it over moderate heat until it comes to the ribbon stage. Added the crushed taro into the sugar and coated well. Removed from heat, allowed cooling, and kept in an airtight container.

Kulhi Bis Fathafolhi

Made of Patna Rice flour, coconut (grated), Rihaakuru, Rihaakuru Bondi (blended), eggs, onion (sliced thinly), curry leaves (chopped), cherry pepper, juice of two limes, ginger, salt to season, and oil by crushing the onion, curry leaves, cherry pepper, ginger with salt. Added and mixed the rice flour and coconut to make the sandy texture. Formed a bay in the center of the rice mixture and add in the eggs and Rihaakuru and Rihaakuru Bondi. Mixed/kneaded the dough and divided the dough into 15  gram balls. Spread each ball to about ¼ inch thickness. Cut using a round cutter of 3 – inch diameter and pre-heated oil.

Meeraa

Made of coconut sap (collected at noon) by boiling the sap over moderate heat and cook by stirring continuously until it comes to the ribbon stage. Removed from heat, greased a large tray and took a spoonful of the cooked thickened syrup, and placed it over the greased sheet in strings.

Thela Kubus

Made of Patna Rice flour, coconut palm syrup, eggs, and coconut oil by whisking the egg and the syrup and added in the rice flour, and beat further. Poured a tablespoonful of the mixture into the oil and deep-fried until golden.

Thelli Keyo

Made of plantain (peeled and cut length-wise) and oil by frying the bananas until crisped. Drained on absorbent kitchen paper and kept airtight container.

Veli Hakuru

Made of coconut palm syrup by boiling the syrup over moderate heat and cook by stirring continuously until it starts to crystallise. Removed from heat, allowed cooling, and put into jars and seal well.

Other Cuisines Regularly Cooked

 Falhoa Aurus
 Naaroh Faludha
 Fuppi Baiy
 Gerhi Banbukeyo
 Gerhi Kattala
 Kaliyaa Kuri Kattala
 Varukuri Baiy

Communities

Maldivian names
A generation ago, most Maldivian people were not commonly known by their birth names. Instead, they were called alternative names such as Dohuttu, Lahuttu, Tutteedi, Kudamaniku, or Don Goma. The rationale behind this practice was that if the evil spirits did not know one's real name, one would be free from their spells. However ancient Maldivian naming system is similar to that of Gujaratis and Marathas. Even now some people follow that system. For example, the first name of historian Mohamed Ibrahim Lutfy is "Mohamed;" "Ibrahim" is his father's name, and "Lutfy" is the family name.

Frequent Maldivian family names include Bee, Beefan, Boo, Didi, Fan, Fulhu, Kader, Kalaminja, Kalinga, Kalo, Kavah, Kavya, Koi, Koya, Manik, Manika, Manike, Manikfan, Naha, Raha, Rana, Tarkan, Thakhan, Thakur, Thakurfan, Veer.

See also 
 Maldivian folklore
 Minicoy
 Giraavaru people

Notes

References

Further reading

 .
 .
 .
 .
 .
 .
 .

External links 
 Maldives Ethnography, by Xavier Romero-Frias
 A Guide to Mahl Language, Minicoy
 Clarence Maloney, his vision, his work and the ancient underlying cultural influences in the Maldives

 01
Ethnic groups in the Indian Ocean
Indo-Aryan peoples
Ethnic groups in India
Ethnic groups in Sri Lanka